Attuma is a supervillain appearing in American comic books published by Marvel Comics. He is an Atlantean nomadic warlord who is usually depicted as an enemy of Namor the Sub-Mariner, and is the father of the superhero Andromeda. He believes he is the prophesied conqueror of the Atlantean Empire.

Alex Livinalli portrays Attuma in his live-action debut in the Marvel Cinematic Universe film Black Panther: Wakanda Forever (2022).

Publication history

Attuma first appeared in Fantastic Four #33 (1964), and was created by Stan Lee (writer) and Jack Kirby (artist).

Fictional character biography
Attuma was born as a member of a tribe of barbaric Atlanteans, who were banished from Atlantis ages ago. For unknown reasons Attuma was born with strength, endurance, and speed far superior to those of any normal Atlantean. Attuma quickly became leader of his tribe and declared that he would conquer the city of Atlantis as an ancient prophecy predicted. Attuma had an illegitimate daughter, Andromeda by a woman named Lady Gelva, but he did not know she gave birth to his only child until confronted by Andromeda. Attuma was disappointed to learn he had a child who wasn't a boy and was disgusted to find out Lady Gelva was the mother as he saw her as a "bullocked whale". Andromeda would later challenge her father as is the right of every first born male child, Attuma allowed the challenge to proceed because Andromeda had been raised as a warrior. Attuma won the challenge but Andromeda was kidnapped by Ghaur before Attuma could kill her.

Attuma gathered his troops and attacked Atlantis, and was defeated by Namor the Sub-Mariner, the Prince of Atlantis and his allies the Fantastic Four. Attuma and his troops were banished from Atlantis once again. Over the years, Attuma has been at war with both Atlantis and the "surface world" (the Atlantean name for the human nations). He developed a super-weapon with which to invade the surface world, but was foiled by Iron Man. Attuma was among the villains assembled by Doctor Doom using a mind-control device in one of his attempts to destroy the Fantastic Four. As his troops left the docks they were knocked back in by a bomb in a HYDRA truck Daredevil had caused to go towards the docks. Mister Fantastic causes the Atlanteans and the other villains to forget this event. He created tidal waves in another attempted invasion of the surface world, and was this time defeated by the Avengers, after they were alerted by the kidnap of the Wasp, although Attuma nearly succeeded in drowning them. Attuma enslaved the nomadic Atlanteans after the destruction of Atlantis. After Atlantis was rebuilt, Attuma attempted another invasion during the wedding of Namor and Dorma. Attuma allied with the Red Ghost, and used mind-controlled sea creatures in another attempted conquest of the surface world, and was this time defeated by the Defenders. With Dr. Dorcas and Tiger Shark, Attuma invaded Hydro-Base, but was then defeated by a teaming of Namor and Doctor Doom. Attuma then enslaved the Avengers to use them against Namor, but unintentionally instigated a battle between the Avengers and Doctor Doom. Attuma was defeated by Namor, Doom, and the Avengers.

When the ruling Council of Atlantis asked Prince Namor to abdicate the throne, Namor obliged and left Atlantis. Attuma was hired with his men as mercenaries to end the Atlantean civil war. Several Atlantean nobles battled for the throne, but Attuma took the throne and became the new ruler of Atlantis. His rule was not a popular one though and Attuma kidnapped Marrina Smallwood, Namor's new wife to embarrass Namor in the eyes of the Atlantean people. Namor, with the help of various superheroes including Alpha Flight and the Avengers, freed Marrina and battled Attuma. Attuma ended the battle when he realized that Namor was happy with Marrina and did not want to return to Atlantis. He did swear vengeance against the superheroes who had allied against him and joined the Lethal Legion, a group of supervillains, shortly afterwards. The Legion was short-lived though and Attuma returned to Atlantis.  During the events of "The Evolutionary War," Attuma joined forces with the Lemurians and reserve Avengers against the High Evolutionary.

As depicted in the crossover Atlantis Attacks, Attuma allied himself with Ghaur and his Deviants and Llyra and her Lemurians against humanity. He battled Iron Man and Namor, and then learned that the superhero Andromeda was his estranged daughter. Attuma mobilized his troops for an assault against the United States. He abducted Marvel Girl as part of Ghaur's plan. Attuma then finally met his daughter Andromeda again, who now led a group of Atlantean rebels against him. Attuma fought his daughter and defeated her in personal combat, but Ghaur spirited her away. Attuma was angered, but continued with their plans. Ghaur and Llyra tricked him though and while Attuma attacked the surface world, battling Spider-Man and the Fantastic Four, Ghaur and Llyra attacked Atlantis and killed a large part of the population as a sacrifice to their god Set. When hearing about Atlantis' destruction, Attuma went into a stupor and the Atlanteans retreated. Attuma was put on trial, but made his way back to Atlantis.

Shortly afterwards, Attuma briefly lost control of Atlantis and Namor returned to the throne, but Attuma regained the throne of Atlantis, when Namor was cursed as one of the Defenders, a curse which would transport Namor away whenever the Defenders were needed and leave Atlantis undefended. Attuma formed the group Deep Six (consisting of Nagala, Orka, Piranha, Sea Urchin, Tiger Shark) to defend Atlantis from Namor and the Defenders. Attuma's "Deep Six" was named after the first Deep Six, a group of heroes who aided Namor, including Andromeda. Though outnumbered, the Defenders outsmarted Attuma and Namor retook Atlantis.

Attuma returned to his barbarian hordes and would make other attempts to conquer Atlantis and the surface world, but without any success. One such attempt would come after Attuma allied his Barbarian hordes with the forces of the futuristic conqueror Kang. His armies would pick Canada as their point of invasion; however they would be turned back by the superhero group, the Avengers.

Attuma attacked New York City with an undersea horde once again. He was confronted by the Sentry, but before Attuma could finish boasting of his plans, the Sentry beheaded him.

Dark Reign
During the Dark Reign storyline, Attuma is restored to life by Victor Von Doom after he reattaches Attuma's head to his body, and Attuma is offered a new chance of power in the vow of destroying Namor once and for all.

Fear Itself
During the Fear Itself storyline, one of the seven Hammers of the Worthy lands near Attuma after it was launched to Earth by the Serpent. He is able to lift it and becomes Nerkodd: Breaker of Oceans. He fights Alpha Flight after he tried to attack Vancouver, but he was defeated. Then soon after that, he heads to Atlantis to overthrow Namor's rule and become the new king of Atlantis.

Marvel NOW!
Sometime later as part of the Marvel NOW! event, Attuma found and unlocked the secrets from the Lost City of Lemuria, using it to attack several places on land. S.H.I.E.L.D. then sent Hulk to deal with the threat.

In a flashback experienced by Nara, her parents were servants of Attuma that were posing as Namor's Royal Guards.

All-New, All-Different Marvel
As part of the All-New, All-Different Marvel event, Attuma was on Atlantis at the time when the Squadron Supreme attacked it in retaliation for Namor and the Cabal having destroyed the worlds of some of its members. Attuma was slain by Power Princess.

Powers and abilities
Attuma possesses various superhuman abilities common to the Atlanteans. However, his strength, stamina, resistance to physical injury, and swimming speed are much higher than the majority of his race. Like most Atlanteans, Attuma could not survive out of water for more than 10 minutes without the aid of mechanical devices or certain chemicals, for most of his life. His stamina, agility, and reflexes also were reduced when out of the water. Like all Atlanteans his specially developed vision allows him to see clearly in the murky depths of the ocean.

After certain genetic and surgical enhancements following his resurrection at the hands of Doctor Doom his strength has been fortified to be on par with the strength of Namor as well as granting him the ability of self-propelled flight and living on land unaided.

Attuma is a skilled Atlantean warrior, trained in the use of many different weapons. He is an expert hand-to-hand combatant, especially underwater, and has achieved mastery in the use of most Atlantean weapons. He usually prefers his three-pronged iron sword, but he has access to highly advanced weaponry.

Other versions

Marvel Adventures
In this child-friendly continuity, Attuma becomes involved after the Invisible Woman is accused of stealing a precious Atlantean artifact.

Marvel Zombies
A zombie Attuma makes an appearance in Dead Days on one panel fighting the Thing alongside Namor. A zombie Namor from another universe fondly remembers finding Attuma and his forces in the Marinaras Trench and slaughtering them.

In other media

Television
 Attuma appeared in the Namor segment of The Marvel Super Heroes.
 Attuma appeared in the Fantastic Four episode "Danger in the Depths", voiced by Henry Corden.
 Attuma appears in The Avengers: United They Stand episode "To Rule Atlantis", voiced by Philip Akin.
 Attuma appears in the Fantastic Four: World's Greatest Heroes episode "Atlantis Attacks".
 Attuma appears in Avengers Assemble, voiced by Dwight Schultz in season one and two and by Dan Donohue in season five. In season one, he is a member of the Red Skull's Cabal until the latter betrays them.
 Attuma appears in Ultimate Spider-Man, voiced again by Dwight Schultz.

Film

Attuma appears in Black Panther: Wakanda Forever, portrayed by Alex Livinalli. This version is a Talokan warrior loyal to Namor.

Video games
 Attuma appears as a boss in Fantastic Four.
 Attuma appears as a boss in Marvel: Ultimate Alliance, voiced by Gregg Berger. This version overthrew Namor and took over Atlantis alongside Tiger Shark.
 Attuma appears in Lego Marvel Super Heroes 2.

References

External links
 Attuma at Marvel.com
 
 

Characters created by Stan Lee
Characters created by Jack Kirby
Comics characters introduced in 1964
Fictional mercenaries in comics
Fictional warlords
Marvel Comics Atlanteans (Homo mermanus)
Marvel Comics characters with superhuman strength
Marvel Comics supervillains
Video game bosses